Bola Philomena Ikulayo (2 June 1948 – 24 March 2016) was the first Nigerian female professor of sport psychology and the founder of Sport Psychology of Association of Nigeria (SPAN).

Early life 
Bola Ikulayo was born on 2 June 1948 in Ikoro-Ekiti, then Southern Region.

Career 

She began working as a teacher in 1967 at St. Benedict Catholic Primary School in Igede, Ekiti State.

References

1948 births
2016 deaths
People from Ekiti State
People from Ekiti State by occupation
Nigerian women academics